Laili Roesad (19 September 1916 – 2003) was the first female diplomat in Indonesia.

Early Life 
Her father was a prominent Minangnese figure and her mother was the first Minang woman who studied at MULO, albeit she did not finish it.

Career
Roesad began her career as an employee of Council of Justice in Padang. She began working for the Ministry of Foreign Affairs in 1949 and served as Ambassador to Austria (1967-1970) and Belgium and often represented Indonesia at United Nations meetings. She also served on the Board of Governors at the International Atomic Energy Agency.

References

External links

[WIKI article in Indonesian]

Ambassadors of Indonesia to Austria
Indonesian women diplomats
Women ambassadors
1916 births
2003 deaths
People from Padang